Smithereens is a 2004 book by the Australian author and comedian Shaun Micallef of essays, plays, poems and sketches.

2004 non-fiction books
Comedy books
Comedy plays